A chase is a heavy steel frame used to hold type in a letterpress. Most of the space in the chase not occupied with type is filled with blocks of wood called furniture. The type and furniture are locked in place by quoins.  When a chase is locked up with type, furniture, and quoins, it is called a forme.

References 

Letterpress printing
Relief printing